Rogat is a village in the Dutch province of Drenthe. It is a part of the municipality of Meppel, and lies about 5 km east of Meppel.

It was first mentioned in 1725 as Rogatschut, and means "chimney". It has partially become an industrial area. The hamlet contains about 40 houses.

References

Populated places in Drenthe
Meppel